Svartidauði were an Icelandic black metal band from Kópavogur, Reykjavík that formed in 2002. The name 'Svarti Dauði' is Icelandic for "Black Death". They released three demos before they released their debut album Flesh Cathedral on Terratur Possessions in 2012, as well as a split EP with the Chilean black metal band 'Perdition'. Flesh Cathedral was received well by the metal press, gaining positive reviews from websites such as Metal-Fi, Lurker's Path, Metal Ireland, and LA Music Blog. Iceland Music Export writes that the band is "Already infamous for their chaotic and often violent live shows in their native Iceland..."

History
On March 3, 2014, Svartidauði announced the release of a new EP titled The Synthesis of Whore and Beast, due out on April 30, 2014, through Terratur Possessions and Daemon Worship Productions. The EP was produced by Stephen Lockhart at Studio Emissary and was available on CD and 12" vinyl. Reviewing the EP, Lords of Metal gave it 95/100 and wrote that "you are left broken, your twisted finger going for the play button and full of joy you dive back into the hell only Svartidauði can deliver."

On March 5, 2014, the band played at the Kings of Black Metal Festival 2014 alongside famous black metal bands such as Mayhem, Hate, and Behexen.

On March 7, 2014, Svartidauði headlined on a European tour called 'Untamed and Unchained 2014' with Mgła, A Thousand Lost Civilizations, and One Tail, One Head. which covered Poland, Italy, Switzerland, The United Kingdom, Belgium and more. The band also took part in the Speyer Grey Mass festival in Germany on March 15, 2014, alongside such bands as Ofermod, Archgoat, Pseudogod, and Funeral Winds.

On March 23, 2014, the band confirmed that they would be performing at Aurora Infernalis in the Netherlands on October 25, 2014, alongside Sapientia and Mortuus from Sweden, and Cult of Fire from Czech Republic.

On September 6, 2017, it was announced that guitarist Nökkvi Gylfgason had departed from the band. On September 7, the band announced that they would be releasing a new 7" EP during their 2017 'Continental Crucifixion' tour with Bölzer, Archgoat, and Eggs of Gomorrh. On September 15, the band announced that they had entered the studio to begin the recording process for a second full-length album titled Revelations of the Red Sword which was released through Ván Records on December 3, 2018.

Discography

Albums
 Flesh Cathedral (2012, Terratur Possessions)
 Revelations of the Red Sword (2018, Ván Records)

EPs
 Perdition / Svartidauði Split (2012, World Terror Committee)
 The Synthesis of Whore and Beast (2014, Terratur Possessions/Daemon Worship Productions)
 Hideous Silhouettes of Lynched Gods (2016, Terrarur Possessions)
 Untitled (2017, Ván Records)

Demos
 The Temple of Deformation (2006, self-released, re-issued on CD 2010)
 Adorned With Fire (2009, self-released)
 Those Who Crawl and Slither Shall Again Inherit the Earth (2010, self-released)

Band members

Last known members
 Magnús – Drums
 Þórir – Guitars
 Sturla Viðar – Bass, vocals

Live members
 Gústaf "G.E." Evensen – Guitars (2017–2022)

Former members
 Gunnar – Bass
 Egill Þór – Bass
 Birkir – Bass
 Hafþór – Drums
 Næturfrost – Guitars
 Nökkvi – Guitars (?-2017)

References

External links
Svartidauði on Bandcamp : http://svartidaudi.bandcamp.com

Icelandic black metal musical groups
Musical groups from Reykjavík
Musical groups established in 2002
Musical quartets